Club de Fútbol Pachuca Reserves and Academy  are the under-20, under-17 and under-15 teams of Mexican Liga MX Pachuca.

History
Pachuca Juniors played its single season at Primera División A in 2004-05 season. After the season the club license was sold and changed name to Indios de Ciudad Juárez. A new team was restarted in 2005–06 Segunda División.

In 2007-08 season, the place of promotion to Primera División A was sold to Chiapas and re-formed as the Jaguares de Tapachula. A new team was affiliated to Segunda División again.

In 2008-09 season, the place of promotion was given to Irapuato FC and Pachuca Juniors B of Tercera División apparently became the new Pachuca Juniors. The team finished the last (18th) in Group V in 2009-10 season.

Current U-20 roster

Current U-18 roster

Current U-16 roster

Seasons

References

Mexican reserve football clubs
Jun